Pierre Pélissier was a pioneer for deaf education in France in the mid-19th century. He was born September 22, 1814, in Gourdon, Lot, and died April 30, 1863. He was a teacher of the deaf and also wrote a dictionary for an early form of French Sign Language in 1856. He studied first at Rodez and Toulouse, under Abbot Chazottes. He then became a teacher at the School of the Deaf in Toulouse. He was the deputy secretary of the Central Society for Deaf Mutes in Paris in 1842. At 29, in 1843, he went to Paris to teach at the Imperial School for Deaf Mutes, until his death.

He is also noted for having been a poet.
The following is an excerpt from one of his poems:
Dans l'œil tu mis tous les dons de l'oreille,
Aux mains, la voix, dans le corps, des spirits:
Et, par leur chant, couronnant ta merveille,
Les sourds-muets se proclament tes fils.

Pélissier's writings
 Choix de poésies d'un sourd-muet, 1834–1845, published 1850.
 Les sourds-muets au XIX siècle : avec un alphabet manuel, 1846.
 Mémoire adressé à M. le ministre de l'Intérieur par les professeurs de l'institution royale des sourds-muets de Paris : sur la nécessité de transférer les Ecoles de sourds-muets au Ministère del'Instruction publique, 1847.
 L'enseignement primaire des sourds-muets mis à la portée de tout le monde, avec une iconographie des signes, published by Paul Dupont, Paris, 1856.

Literature
Quartararo, Anne T. 2008. The Poetry of a Minority Community: Deaf Poet Pierre Pélissier and the Formation of a Deaf Identity in the 1850s. Sign Language Studies 8.3: 241–263.

References

1814 births
1863 deaths
Educators of the deaf
Deaf poets
Deaf culture
19th-century French poets
French deaf people
French Sign Language